Audrey Marnay is a French actress and model. She was born on October 14, 1980, in Chartres, Eure-et-Loir.

Early life 
Marnay was born in Chartres, department of Eure-et-Loir on October 14, 1980.

Career
At the age of 15, Marnay started working at a modeling agency in Paris. A year later, she was named top model and was featured on 32 pages and the cover of Vogue Italy, photographed by Steven Meisel. She has also been featured on the pages and covers of Vogue, Elle, Harper's Bazaar, and luxury brands such as Chanel, Versace, Lanvin, Calvin Klein, Valentin, and Longchamp.

She has worked with directors including Patrice Leconte, Raoul Ruiz, David Foenkinos, Stefan Liberski, Arielle Dombasle, and Cedric Klapisch. In 2014, George Clooney selected her to star in his movie The Monuments Men.

Marnay is involved in multiple creative pursuits: in fashion (capsule collections for Claudie Pierlot), jewelry design (Etername), and singing (Alain Chamfort Manureva), and she is the muse for Air in their video clips. The French artist Pierre Huyghe cast her in The Host and The Cloud[1]. Marney became the spokesperson for “Les Enfants de Bam” in 2010.

In 2021, Marnay revealed herself as the woman depicted in the cover artwork for the 2001 album Jane Doe by metalcore band Converge, claiming in an Instagram post that a photograph of her from the May 2001 issue of Marie Claire Italy magazine taken by Dutch fashion photographer Jan Welters was the original source artwork used by Converge vocalist and cover artist Jacob Bannon.

Filmography
 How does it make you feel by Antoine Bardou-Jacquet for Air (2001)
 Nuages by Michel Gondry for Air France (2002)
 Bunker Paradise by Stefan Liberski Laeticia
 My Best Friend by Patrice Leconte (2006)
 Tony Zoreil by Valentin Potier (2007)
 Paris by Cedric Klapish (Marjolaine 2008)
 The Monuments Men by George Clooney (2014)

References

External links

Bunker Paradise | Wayback Machine

1980 births
French female models
Living people
French film actresses
21st-century French actresses
People from Chartres